Tendring Technology College is a secondary school with Sixth Form College located in Essex, England. It is one of the five secondary schools in the Tendring district, along with Clacton Coastal Academy, Clacton County High School, Colne and the Harwich and Dovercourt High School.

The college has been rated 'Inadequate' by Ofsted in 2021. The Academy is currently subject of a Termination Warning.

History 
The academy was previously led by Mike Watson, however in 2004, he went into early retirement after twenty years at the school, and was replaced by Caroline Hayes. Caroline Hayes remained Principal of Tendring Technology College for 12 Years before stepping down in 2016. Michael Muldoon became the Principal in 2016. Muldoon resigned as head teacher in May 2021.

Facilities 
The academy saw extensive building work at its Frinton Campus in 2003 when new departmental buildings were erected. One of these new buildings, the Watson building, was named after former Principal Michael Watson and is currently occupied by the performing arts department. After a long battle the academy secured the funding for a £2.8 million state-of-the-art Sixth Form Centre, which is based at the Frinton Campus site and reached completion in September 2011. The new building features facilities such as a media suite and social area, as well as extra teaching space. Tendring Technology College was one of only several schools to receive such finding from the Learning Schools Council. This follows previous upgrades to the Frinton Campus, which created new teaching space, a new Resources Centre and exterior improvements.

Notable former pupils 
Notable former pupils of the school include:

Alex Porter - Former Great Britain volleyball team captain
Ben Foakes - England cricketer
Mike Haywood - Northampton Saints rugby player
Ellie Challis - Tokyo 2020 Paralympic Games silver medallist

References

External links 
 
TTC Intranet

Academies in Essex
Secondary schools in Essex
Academies Enterprise Trust
Educational institutions established in 1871
1871 establishments in England
Specialist technology colleges in England
Technology College